John Trevor (1855–1930) was an English Unitarian minister who formed The Labour Church.

Early life
John was born in Liverpool; his mother died when he was still a child and he was raised by his maternal grandmother, a strict Johnsonian Baptist. He was converted by a Unitarian minister.

Formation of the Labour Church
John Trevor formed The Labour Church in 1891 in Manchester. He left the Labour Church in 1900 and the Church never recovered from its loss and disappeared by World War I.

Death
After a decade of increasing loneliness John Trevor died in 1930.

References

External links

1855 births
1930 deaths
Clergy from Liverpool